Rolland Mays Stiles (November 17, 1906 – July 22, 2007) was an American right-handed pitcher in Major League Baseball who played for the St. Louis Browns from  to . Born in Ratcliff, Arkansas, he batted and threw right-handed, and was 9–14 with an earned run average of 5.92 in his three seasons. Rollie attended Southeastern State Teachers College. His first game in the major leagues was on June 19, and his last game was October 1, . Stiles' nicknames when playing baseball were "Leapin' Lena", "Lena", and "Rollie", all typical of how he signed autographs for baseball fans.

Stiles made an appearance and gave a speech at the St. Louis Browns Reunion dinner held at the Missouri Athletic Club on June 8, 2006 in St. Louis, Missouri. He died in his sleep at age 100 on July 22, 2007 at the Bethesda Southgate Nursing Home in St. Louis.

Stiles was the last living person to have pitched to Babe Ruth. While he was the oldest living major league ballplayer at the time of his death, Stiles was not the oldest living professional baseball player; that distinction was held by Emilio Navarro of the Negro leagues, who turned 103 years old in 2008.

See also
List of centenarians (Major League Baseball players)
List of centenarians (sportspeople)

Sources

External links

SABR Biography Project
Photograph of Rollie Stiles age 99 in 2006
Article about Rollie Stiles and Babe Ruth
Video interview with Rollie Stiles discussing Babe Ruth and Lou Gehrig
Rollie's 100th birthday in the St. Louis newspaper

1906 births
2007 deaths
American centenarians
Baseball players from Arkansas
Chattanooga Lookouts players
Dallas Steers players
Jersey City Giants players
Kansas City Blues (baseball) players
Longview Cannibals players
Major League Baseball pitchers
Men centenarians
Milwaukee Brewers (minor league) players
Muskogee Chiefs players
People from Logan County, Arkansas
St. Louis Browns players
Southeastern Oklahoma State Savage Storm baseball players
Tulsa Oilers (baseball) players
Wichita Falls Spudders players